Jack Patrick Curtis (born January 11, 1937) is an American former professional baseball player and left-handed pitcher who worked in 69 games in Major League Baseball for the Chicago Cubs (1961–62), Milwaukee Braves (1962) and Cleveland Indians (1963).

Curtis joined the MLB Cubs after two stalwart seasons in minor league baseball. In 1959, he won 20 games (losing 10) with a sparkling 2.84 earned run average for the Class B Wenatchee Chiefs. Then, in 1960, he went 19–8 (3.57) for the Double-A San Antonio Missions and was named the Texas League's pitcher of the year.

In his rookie campaign, Curtis took a turn in the Cubs' starting rotation and won ten games, tied for second on the team. He threw six complete games. However, Curtis finished below .500 with 13 defeats and posted a  4.89 ERA. In , he began the year by going winless in three starts and one relief appearance during April. On April 30, Curtis was traded even-up for veteran Braves' starting pitcher Bob Buhl, a former National League All-Star. But Curtis made only five starts for Milwaukee through the end of 1962 and put up a 4–4 record in 30 games, with one save. At the end of the season, he was traded again, this time to the Cleveland Indians, who had just hired manager Birdie Tebbetts away from the Braves. He was sent to Triple-A Jacksonville at the May cutdown after allowing ten earned runs in only five innings pitched. The rest of his pro career was spent in the minors. Curtis retired in 1967.

During his MLB career, Curtis compiled a career record of 14–19 with a 4.84 earned run average. In 279 innings pitched, he permitted 328 hits and 89 bases on balls with 108 strikeouts. He was credited with six complete games and two saves.

References

External links

1937 births
Living people
Baseball players from North Carolina
Burlington Bees players
Charlotte Hornets (baseball) players
Chicago Cubs players
Cleveland Indians players
Jacksonville Suns players
Magic Valley Cowboys players
Major League Baseball pitchers
Milwaukee Braves players
Paris Lakers players
People from Caldwell County, North Carolina
Portland Beavers players
Ponca City Cubs players
Pueblo Bruins players
San Antonio Missions players
Syracuse Chiefs players
Toledo Mud Hens players
Wenatchee Chiefs players
Crestview Braves players